Def Jam's Rush Hour 2 Soundtrack is the soundtrack to Brett Ratner's 2001 action-comedy film Rush Hour 2. It was released on July 31, 2001, through Def Jam Recordings/UMG Soundtracks. The album was a success making it to 11 on both the Billboard 200 and the Top R&B/Hip-Hop Albums and 1 on the Top Soundtracks, and contained the following 3 singles: "Area Codes", "Party and Bullshit", "How It's Gonna Be". The album was certified Gold by the Recording Industry Association of Japan in July 2001 and by the Recording Industry Association of America on September 5, 2001.

Track listing

Charts

Certifications

References

External links

2001 soundtrack albums
Action film soundtracks
Comedy film soundtracks
Albums produced by E-A-Ski
Albums produced by Focus...
Albums produced by Jazze Pha
Rhythm and blues soundtracks
Albums produced by Rockwilder
Albums produced by Dre & Vidal
Albums produced by Swizz Beatz
Albums produced by Teddy Riley
Def Jam Recordings soundtracks
Albums produced by the Neptunes
Albums produced by Gerald Levert
Albums produced by Rodney Jerkins
Albums produced by Warryn Campbell